Claude Rohla (9 November 1951 – 20 September 2011) was a Luxembourgian archer. He competed in the men's individual event at the 1984 Summer Olympics.

References

1951 births
2011 deaths
Luxembourgian male archers
Olympic archers of Luxembourg
Archers at the 1984 Summer Olympics
Sportspeople from Esch-sur-Alzette